Silvio Bankert (born 13 June 1985 in Luckenwalde) is a German footballer who plays for 1. FC Magdeburg in the Regionalliga Nordost.

Career 
On 10 May 2016, Bankert decided to end his career on 30 June 2016, but will continue his work at Magdeburg as their coach in the youth department.

References

External links 
 
 

1985 births
Living people
Sportspeople from Luckenwalde
People from Bezirk Potsdam
German footballers
Footballers from Brandenburg
Association football defenders
3. Liga players
FC Energie Cottbus II players
1. FC Magdeburg players
Chemnitzer FC players